This is a list of 126 species in Ormyrus, a genus of chalcid wasps in the family Ormyridae.

Ormyrus species

 Ormyrus absonus Narendran, 1999 c g
 Ormyrus acylus Hanson, 1992 c g
 Ormyrus aeros Narendran, 1999 c g
 Ormyrus alus Narendran, 1999 c g
 Ormyrus ardahanensis (Doganlar, 1991) c g
 Ormyrus aridus Zerova, 2005 c g
 Ormyrus asiaticus Narendran, 1999 c g
 Ormyrus australiensis Girault, 1915 c g
 Ormyrus australis Risbec, 1957 c g
 Ormyrus badius De Stefani, 1898 c g
 Ormyrus benazeer Narendran, 1999 c g
 Ormyrus benjaminae Narendran, 1999 c g
 Ormyrus bicarinatus Girault, 1915 c g
 Ormyrus bicolor Zerova, 2006 c g
 Ormyrus bicoloripes Girault, 1915 c g
 Ormyrus bingoeliensis Doganlar, 1991 c g
 Ormyrus borneanus Narendran, 1999 c g
 Ormyrus bouceki Narendran, 1999 c g
 Ormyrus brasiliensis Ashmead, 1904 c g
 Ormyrus bucharicus Zerova, 1985 c g
 Ormyrus burwelli Narendran, 1999 c g
 Ormyrus caeruleus Walker, 1850 c g
 Ormyrus calycopteridis Narendran, 1999 c g
 Ormyrus capsalis Askew, 1994 c g
 Ormyrus carinativentris Girault, 1915 c g
 Ormyrus chalybeus (Ratzeburg, 1844) c g
 Ormyrus chevalieri (Risbec, 1955) c g
 Ormyrus cingulatus (Forster, 1860) g
 Ormyrus classeyi Narendran, 1999 c g
 Ormyrus cosmozonus Forster, 1860 g
 Ormyrus crassus Hanson, 1992 c g
 Ormyrus cubitalis Narendran, 1999 c g
 Ormyrus cupreus Askew, 1998 c g
 Ormyrus curiosus Narendran, 1999 c g
 Ormyrus dahmsi Narendran, 1999 c g
 Ormyrus desertus Zerova & Dawah, 2003 c g
 Ormyrus destefanii Mayr, 1904 c g
 Ormyrus diffinis (Fonscolombe, 1832) c g
 Ormyrus discolor Zerova, 2005 c g
 Ormyrus distinctus Fullaway, 1912 c g
 Ormyrus diversus Narendran, 1999 c g
 Ormyrus dryorhizoxeni Ashmead, 1885 c g
 Ormyrus ermolenkoi Zerova, 2006 c g
 Ormyrus eugeniae Risbec, 1955 c g
 Ormyrus ferus Narendran, 1999 c g
 Ormyrus flavipes Boucek, 1981 c g
 Ormyrus flavitibialis Yasumatsu & Kamijo, 1979 c g
 Ormyrus gopii Narendran, 1999 c g
 Ormyrus gratiosus (Forster, 1860) g
 Ormyrus halimodendri Zerova, 1985 c g
 Ormyrus hansoni Narendran, 1999 c g
 Ormyrus harithus Narendran, 1999 c g
 Ormyrus hebridensis Narendran, 1999 c g
 Ormyrus hegeli (Girault, 1917) c g
 Ormyrus hongkongensis Narendran, 1999 c g
 Ormyrus ibaraki Zerova, 2006 c g
 Ormyrus ignotus Narendran, 1999 c g
 Ormyrus kalabak Narendran, 1999 c g
 Ormyrus kama Narendran, 1999 c g
 Ormyrus kamijoi Narendran, 1999 c g
 Ormyrus keralensis Narendran & Abdurahiman, 1990 c g
 Ormyrus labotus Walker, 1843 c g
 Ormyrus laccatus Zerova, 1985 c g
 Ormyrus lanatus Zerova, 1985 c g
 Ormyrus langlandi Girault, 1920 c g
 Ormyrus laosensis Narendran, 1999 c g
 Ormyrus lepidus Narendran, 1999 c g
 Ormyrus lini Chen, 1999 c g
 Ormyrus longicaudus Narendran, 1999 c g
 Ormyrus longicornis Boucek, 1969 c g
 Ormyrus maai Narendran, 1999 c g
 Ormyrus macaoensis Narendran, 1999 c g
 Ormyrus malabaricus Narendran, 1999 c g
 Ormyrus mareebensis Narendran, 2001 c g
 Ormyrus monegricus Askew, 1994 c g
 Ormyrus negriensis Narendran, 1999 c g
 Ormyrus nishidai Narendran, 1999 c g
 Ormyrus nitidulus (Fabricius, 1804) c g
 Ormyrus nkoloensis Rasplus g
 Ormyrus noyesi Narendran, 1999 c g
 Ormyrus orientalis Walker, 1871 c g
 Ormyrus orupol Narendran, 1999 c g
 Ormyrus pallens Lotfalizadeh & Askew g
 Ormyrus papaveris (Perris, 1840) c g
 Ormyrus papuanicus Narendran, 1999 c g
 Ormyrus parvulus Zerova, 1985 c g
 Ormyrus philippinensis Hedqvist, 1968 c g
 Ormyrus pomaceus (Geoffroy, 1785) c g
 Ormyrus punctulatus (Forster, 1860) g
 Ormyrus reticulatus Hanson, 1992 c g
 Ormyrus retusae Narendran, 1999 c g
 Ormyrus rosae Ashmead, 1885 c g
 Ormyrus rufimanus Mayr, 1904 c g
 Ormyrus salmanticus Nieves Aldrey, 1984 c g
 Ormyrus sculptilis Crosby, 1909 c g
 Ormyrus secus Narendran, 1999 c g
 Ormyrus sedlaceki Narendran, 1999 c g
 Ormyrus setosus Hanson, 1992 c g
 Ormyrus sheelae Narendran, 1999 c g
 Ormyrus shonus Narendran, 1999 c g
 Ormyrus silvae Girault, 1925 c g
 Ormyrus similis Zerova, 1985 c g
 Ormyrus solitarius (Olivier, 1791) g
 Ormyrus speculifer Erdos, 1946 g
 Ormyrus stom Narendran, 1999 c g
 Ormyrus striatus Cameron, 1907 c g
 Ormyrus subconicus Boucek, 1981 c g
 Ormyrus sydneyensis Narendran, 1999 c g
 Ormyrus tanus Narendran, 1999 c g
 Ormyrus tenompokus Narendran, 1999 c g
 Ormyrus tenuis Hanson, 1992 c g
 Ormyrus thymus Girault, 1917 c g
 Ormyrus tschami (Doganlar, 1991) c g
 Ormyrus turio Hanson, 1992 c g
 Ormyrus unfasciatipennis Girault, 1917 c g
 Ormyrus unimaculatipennis Girault, 1916 c g
 Ormyrus vacciniicola Ashmead, 1887 c g b
 Ormyrus venustus Hanson, 1992 c g b
 Ormyrus versicolor Forster, 1860 g
 Ormyrus violaceus Forster, 1860 g
 Ormyrus wachtli Mayr, 1904 c g
 Ormyrus watshami Boucek, 1981 c g
 Ormyrus williamsi Narendran, 1999 c g
 Ormyrus zamoorini Narendran, 1999 c g
 Ormyrus zandanus Narendran, 1999 c g
 Ormyrus zoae Zerova, 2005 c g

Data sources: i = ITIS, c = Catalogue of Life, g = GBIF, b = Bugguide.net

References

Ormyrus